Swahili literature is, generally speaking, literature written in the Swahili language, particularly by Swahili people of the East African coast and the neighboring islands. It may also refer to literature written by people who write in the Swahili language.  It is an offshoot of the Bantu culture.

The first literary works date back to the beginning of the 18th century, when all Swahili literature was written in the Arabic script. Jan Knappert considered the translation of the Arabic poem Hamziya from the year 1652 to be the earliest Swahili written text. Starting in the 19th century, missionaries and orientalists introduced the Latin script for writing the Swahili language.

Characteristics
Swahili literature has been an object of research by many western scholars since the 19th century. There is a debate regarding objectivity as a few scholars tried to establish a canon of Swahili writing.

One of the main characteristics of Swahili literature is the relative heterogeneity of the Swahili language. One can find works written in Kiamu (see for example the poetry by Ustadh Mau), Kimvita, Kipemba, Kiunguja, Kimrima, Kimtang'ata, Ki-Dar es Salaam and Ki-Nairobi which are considered varieties of Swahili.

Swahili literature has been sometimes characterized as Islamic by some western scholars such as Jan Knappert. This approach was criticized by some experts such as Alamin Mazrui and Ibrahim Noor Shariff. In fact, Swahili poetry has produced many secular works by such poets as Muyaka bin Ghassany and Muhammad Kijuma.

Because of this orientalist exploration and interest in the Swahili culture and language, most of the theses made on the Swahili literature have been done outside of the native place.

Classification
Swahili literature is classified into three genres: Riwaya (the novel), tamthilia (drama/play) and ushairi (poetry). Scholars, however, cite the problem in the literary classification because the sense of orientation associated to genre does not work properly for Swahili literature. The lack of clear and decisive parameters for genres can be illustrated by the convergence of oral and written literary forms. Rajmund Ohly noted that the names of genres are not well defined while denominations are too vague to distinguish class divisions.

Fiction
Fiction in Swahili literature mainly consisted of oral narrative traditions. It was not until the 1940s that Swahili started to have a written fiction. Modern Swahili literature is a direct result of the standardization of Swahili. Previously, writers would write in a particular dialect to show their attachment to a certain dialect, such as Lamu, Tanga or Mombasa. The normalization of Swahili motivated writers, such as George Mhina and Lyndon Harries to promote the development of Swahili by creating a literary corpus.

Poetry

Generally, Swahili poetry is derived from Arabic poetry. According to an account, the traditional poetry is created to be sung rather than read. It began in the northern Kenya coastal towns of Lamu and Pate before spreading to Tanga Region, Zanzibar and other nearby areas. The poetic tradition is still alive today as pieces are often published in local newspapers and used in taraab songs and musical theater popular in Zanzibar and the Swahili coast.

However, there are a few fundamental differences between the Swahili and Arabic poetry.  With much of African influence, the two poems can hardly be compared for it is sui generis.

Traditional poetry can be classified into different groups according to its form and content. It can be epic, lyrical or didactic, as well as religious or secular. Examples of narrative poetry, known as utenzi, include the Utendi wa Tambuka by Bwana Mwengo (dated to about 1728) and the Utenzi wa Shufaka.

Use of Swahili prose was until recently practically restricted to utilitarian purposes. However, the traditional art of oral expression in poetry has produced a  number of valuable works. It is characterized by its homiletic aspects, heroic songs, folklore ballads and humorous dialogues which accurately depict Swahili life, cultural beliefs and traditions. Because of the immediate historical aspect of the Swahili literature, especially in the 19th century, it is still a hard job to interpret many of the poems due to the lack of knowledge of the context in which the poem was written.

Notable literary people
 Farouk Topan, Zanzibar
 Christopher Mwashinga (1965-), Tanzania
 Ebrahim Hussein (1943- ), Tanzania
 Muhammed Said Abdulla (1918-1991), Tanzania
 Fadhy Mtanga (1981 -), Tanzania 
 Pera Ridhiwani (1917–1997 ), Tanzania
 May Balisidya (?- 1987), Tanzania
 Mzee Hamis Akida (22 November 1914 - 13th Feb 2007), Tanzania
 Said Khamis (12 December 1947-), Zanzibar
 Abdilatif Abdalla (14 April 1946-), Kenya
 Adam Shafi Adam (1940-), Zanzibar
 Mohamed Suleiman Mohamed (1945-), Zanzibar
 Ali Alamin Mazrui (1933-2014), Kenya
 Katama Mkangi (1945-2004), Kenya
 Said Ahmed Mohamed
 Shaaban bin Robert (1909-1962), Tanzania
 Kyallo Wadi Wamitilla, Kenya
 John Hamu Habwe, Kenya
 Mwenda Mbatih, Kenya
 Ken Walibora, Kenya
Haji Gora Haji, Zanzibar

See also

 African literature
 Siku Njema
 Utendi wa Tambuka "The Story of Tambuka"
 Utenzi "a form of narrative poetry"
Hamisi Akida Bin Said

External links
 Britannica entry on Swahili literature
 Swahili Manuscripts Database Project
 UCLA Swahili Poetry Project
 
 Learn Swahili software
 Swahili folktales collected by Edward Steere at the Internet Archive

Bibliography
 
 
 
 Knappert, Jan (1982) 'Swahili oral traditions', in V. Görög-Karady (ed.) Genres, forms, meanings: essays in African oral literature, 22–30.
 Knappert, Jan (1983) Epic poetry in Swahili and other African languages. Leiden: Brill.
 Knappert, Jan (1990) A grammar of literary Swahili. (Working papers on Swahili, 10). Gent: Seminarie voor Swahili en de Taalproblematiek van de Ontwikkelingsgebieden.
 Nagy, Géza Füssi, The rise of Swahili literature and the œuvre of Shaaban bin Robert (Academic journal)
 Topan, Farouk, Why Does a Swahili Writer Write? Euphoria, Pain, and Popular Aspirations in Swahili Literature (Academic journal)
 Lodhi, Abdulaziz Y. and Lars Ahrenberg (1985) Swahililitteratur - en kort šversikt. (Swahili literature: a short overview.) In: Nytt från Nordiska Afrikainstitutet, no 16, pp 18–21. Uppsala. (Reprinted in Habari, vol 18(3), 198-.)
 The Political Culture of Language: Swahili, Society and the State (Studies on Global Africa)by Ali A. Mazrui, Alamin M. Mazrui

References and notes